Pajau is a town in Kachin State, Myanmar. The Kachin Independence Organisation (KIO) previously maintained its headquarters in the town, until it was moved to Laiza in 2005.

References

Populated places in Kachin State